Mi novia el... (My Girlfriend the...) is a 1975 Argentine comedy film. The original title, Mi novia el travesti ("My Girlfriend the Transvestite") was edited by Argentine censors when the film was first released. The original script was about a real travesti supposed to be protagonized by Jorge Perez, a famous travesti under the name of Jorge Perez Evelyn. However, the censorship was so strong that the script was changed and Perez was replaced with actress Susana Giménez.

The plot is based on the 1933 German film Victor and Victoria.

Plot
Alberto is a regular middle-aged man who lives with his elder mother and works at a factory. After a night out where he attends a show by transvestite artist Dominique, he develops an unexpected fixation with the artist. What started out as a loud reaction of disgust and bigotry, slowly turns into him realizing that he is in fact attracted to Dominique. This newfound interest fills Alberto's mind with guilt and doubt, while his coworkers start mocking him for dating a "weirdo", and his family grieve his lost decency. In the midst of Alberto's predicament, a revelation by Dominique will shake the board.

Cast
 Alberto Olmedo as	Alberto aka Laucha
 Susana Giménez as	Dominique/María Isabel 
 Cacho Espíndola as Lince
 Tristán as Alfonso
 Marcos Zucker as Serafín
 Tincho Zabala as Gustavo aka Tordo
 María Rosa Fugazot as Delia
 Menchu Quesada as Alberto's Mother
 Nené Malbrán as Margarita
 Adolfo Linvel as Don Francisco
 Alita Román as María Isabel's Mother
 Pedro Quartucci as María Isabel's Father
 Pablo Cumo
 Ricardo Jordán
 Constanza Maral as Alberto's coworker
 Daniel Miglioranza as Alberto's coworker
 Alfonso Pícaro as Amigo despedida soltero
 Raúl Ricutti
 Jorge Porcel

References

External links
 

1975 films
Argentine LGBT-related films
Cross-dressing in film
1970s Spanish-language films
1970s Argentine films